Kelley Robinson (born ) is an African American community organizer who is the current president of the Human Rights Campaign. She was formerly the executive director of Planned Parenthood Action Fund.

Education 
Robinson received a Bachelor of Arts degree from the University of Missouri-Columbia in 2008. During university, she double-majored in sociology and women's and gender studies. Robinson experienced severe racism that led her to take an educational hiatus.

Career 
Robinson started working as a political organizer for Barack Obama's presidential campaign in 2008.

In 2009, she worked at Planned Parenthood of the Heartland as a regional organizer. From 2011 to 2015, she served as the associate director for youth engagement for Planned Parenthood Federation of America, until she was promoted to national organizing director in 2015. In 2019, she became the executive director of the Planned Parenthood Action Fund and vice president of organizing and advocacy. In this role, Robinson helped direct efforts to flip the U.S. Senate in the 2020 elections. While at Planned Parenthood, the number of supporters increased from 6.5 million to 18 million.

As the executive director of the Planned Parenthood Action Fund, Robinson was interviewed about reproductive rights, the Hyde Amendment, and Supreme Court nominees by several media outlets such as the Associated Press, CNN, The Guardian, and The New York Times. 

Robinson is now the current president of the Human Rights Campaign (HRC). She is the first queer Black woman to lead the organization. Robinson has stated that she will focus on issues such as voting rights, reproductive rights, LGBTQ+ rights, living wages and health care; she will focus on the voices and concerns of impoverished people. In one interview, Robinson stated that HRC was planning to work towards the passage of the Respect for Marriage Act. In one of the first interviews that she gave as HRC president, to El Pais, Robinson addressed the rise of hate acts against LGBTQ communities. In the month of December of the year 2022, Robinson testified before Congress on the rise of anti-LGBTQ+ extremism and violence.

Personal life 
Robinson married her wife, Becky George, in 2020; they have one child together.

References 

1980s births
American community activists
American health activists
LGBT African Americans
Living people
21st-century African-American people
21st-century African-American women
University of Missouri alumni
American LGBT rights activists